Tabanus sparus is a species of horse fly in the family Tabanidae.

Distribution
United States.

Subspecies
These two subspecies belong to the species Tabanus sparus:
 Tabanus sparus milleri Whitney, 1914
 Tabanus sparus sparus Whitney, 1879

References

Tabanidae
Insects described in 1879
Diptera of North America